Melica lilloi is a species of grass found in Catamarca and Tucumán provinces of Argentina at  above sea level.

Description
The species is perennial with short rhizomes. The leaf-sheaths are scabrous, tubular, are closed on one end. Both the leaf-sheaths and leaf-blades have a glabrous surface.

The pedicels are filiform, curved, pubescent, and hairy above. The spikelets have 1-2 fertile florets which is diminished at the apex while the sterile florets are barren, cuneate, and clumped with its floret callus being glabrous. Both the upper and lower glumes are keelless, membranous and have acute apexes.

The species' lemma have scaberulous surface and have emarginated apex as well. The fruits are caryopsis with additional pericarp and linear hilum.

Ecology
Its flowering time is from December to January.

References

lilloi
Endemic flora of Argentina
Flora of South America